UFM100.3 is a Chinese-language radio station of SPH Media Trust based in Singapore. UFM100.3 is a highly-charged Mandarin music station targeting at working professionals aged between 35 – 49 years old. The station plays popular and familiar mandarin hits, with engaging lifestyle content and current hot topics for the busy individual. The station is organised under the Chinese Media group, which also includes SPH Media Trust's Chinese media publications such as broadsheet Lianhe Zaobao and Shin Min Daily News.

Accolades 
The station is also recognized by the National Arts Council for its contribution towards Singapore's arts sector, being a recipient of the SG50 Arts Patron Award in 2015, a Distinguished Patron of the Arts Award recipient in 2010, 2011, 2014, a Patron of the Arts Award in 2013 and 2015 and a Friend of the Arts Award in 2012.

See also
 List of radio stations in Singapore

References

External links
  

Radio stations in Singapore
Mandarin-language radio stations